Edmund Białas (August 15, 1919 in Poznań – July 24, 1991 in Poznań) was a Polish football player who played and coached Lech Poznań. He first started playing for Lech Poznań in 1931, and continued through to play for the Polish national team for eight years. He expected to play more in his early professional years, but the outbreak of the Second World War stopped matches from taking place, most notably one in which he participated against Bulgaria which was abandoned mid-match.

In total Białas played for Lech Poznań in 64 matches, scoring 27 goals. He later became a football trainer and instructor for Lech after his retirement in 1951.

References

1919 births
1991 deaths
Polish footballers
Poland international footballers
Lech Poznań players
Polish football managers
Lech Poznań managers
Footballers from Poznań
Association football forwards